AlloCiné is an entertainment website which specializes on providing information on French cinema, mostly centering on novelties' promotion with DVD, Blu-ray and VOD information. The enterprise was founded as a telephonic communicator, and subsequently became an Internet portal site, which offers sufficient information by fast access and covers all movies that have been distributed in France. In 2005, it began covering television series. The website is considered the "French equivalent of IMDb."

AlloCiné was launched in 1993, before being purchased by Canal+ in 2000 and Vivendi Universal in 2002. From June 2007 to 2013, it was under the ownership of Tiger Global, an American investment fund. 

Since July 2013, Allociné is owned by FIMALAC, a French holding company and hosted inside the Webedia group, a FIMALAC company.

On 5 September 2011, AlloCiné launched AlloCiné TV, a now defunct private TV channel.

References

Further reading

External links
 

French companies established in 1993
Internet properties established in 1993
French film websites
Information by telephone
Online companies of France
Online film databases